Census Division No. 9 is composed of the area of the province of Newfoundland and Labrador called the Northern Peninsula. It has a land area of 13,527.12 km² (5,222.85 sq mi) and had a population of 15,607 at the 2016 census. The largest community is the town of St. Anthony, near its northern tip, on the Atlantic Ocean coast.

It includes most of the Great Northern Peninsula, along with Gros Morne National Park.

Demographics 

Towns

Unorganized subdivisions
Subdivision A (Includes: Wiltondale, Lomond, Green Point)
Subdivision C (Includes: Plum Point, St. Barbe, Savage Cove)
Subdivision D (Includes: Ship Cove, Straitsview, Great Brehat)
Subdivision F (Includes: Croque, Williamsport, Grandois)
Subdivision G (Includes: Eddies Cove West, Barr'd Harbour)
Subdivision H (Includes: Three Mile Rock, Portland Creek, Shallow Bay)

References

Sources

009